Daniel Wisgott (born 13 February 1988, in Essen) is a German rower.

References 
 

1988 births
Living people
German male rowers
Sportspeople from Essen
World Rowing Championships medalists for Germany